Groove or Grooves may refer to:

Music 
 Groove (music)
 Groove (drumming)
 The Groove (band), an Australian rock/pop band of the 1960s
 The Groove (Sirius XM), a US radio station
 Groove 101.7FM, a former Perth, Australia, radio station
 Groove (Eurogliders album), 1988
 Groove (Billy Crawford album), 2009
 Groove (Richard "Groove" Holmes album), 1961
"The Groove" (song), a 1980 song by Rodney Franklin
 Groove Music, Microsoft software
 Groove Records, record label
 "Groove", a song by Exo from Obsession
 "Groove", song by Jay Haze from A Bugged Out Mix
 "The Groove", 2003 song by Muse, B-side to "Time Is Running Out"
 The Groove, a dance club in the Universal CityWalk section of Universal Orlando Resort

Other uses 
 Grooves (archaeology), long and narrow indentations
 Groove (engineering), a long and narrow indentation built into a material
 Groove (film), a 2000 US film
 Groove (joinery), a slot cut parallel to the grain
 Grooves (magazine), a music magazine
 Chevrolet Groove, a concept car model, then a sport utility vehicle model sold since 2020
 Microsoft Office Groove, older name of Microsoft SharePoint Workspace
 Major and minor groove, the spaces between two strands of a DNA double-helix

See also
 Richard Holmes (organist) (1931–1991), American jazz organist known as Groove
 Groovin' (disambiguation)
 Groovy (disambiguation)
 Grove (disambiguation)
 Fluting (architecture), in architecture refers to the shallow grooves running vertically along a surface